The Zagyva is a river in Hungary. Its length is 179 km, and drains an area of about 5,677 km2. The source is near Salgótarján in Nógrád county. It flows through the towns of Bátonyterenye, Pásztó, Hatvan and Jászberény and flows into the Tisza at Szolnok. Average discharge at Szolnok is 9 m³/s. The Zagyva is the longest river in Hungary that has both its source and its confluence within the country's borders.

Etymology
The name comes from Slavic sadjati: to settle (sediments). *Sadzava: a river that carries many sediments, see i.e. Czech Sázava.

In Hungarian the name means 'muddled' (zagyvál(ni): 'to muddle').

Tributaries

The following rivers are tributaries to the river Zagyva (from source to mouth):

Left: Iványi, Mindszenti, Galya, Lengyendi, Kecskés
Right: Galga

References

Rivers of Hungary